The 1956–57 Scottish Division One was won by Rangers by two points over nearest rival Heart of Midlothian. Dunfermline Athletic and Ayr United finished 17th and 18th respectively and were relegated to the 1957–58 Scottish Division Two.

League table

Results

References

Scottish Football Archive

1956–57 Scottish Football League
Scottish Division One seasons
Scot